Nielsen Media Research (NMR) is an American firm that measures media audiences, including television, radio, theatre, films (via the AMC Theatres MAP program), and newspapers. Headquartered in New York City, it is best known for the Nielsen ratings, an audience measurement system of television viewership that for years has been the deciding factor in canceling or renewing television shows by television networks. As of May 2012, it is part of Nielsen Holdings.

NMR began as a division of ACNielsen, a 1923-founded marketing research firm. In 1996, NMR was split off into an independent company, and in 1999, was 
purchased by the Dutch conglomerate VNU. In 2001, VNU also purchased ACNielsen, thereby bringing both companies under the same corporate umbrella. NMR is also a sister company to Nielsen//NetRatings, which measures Internet and digital media audiences. VNU was reorganized and renamed the Nielsen Company in 2007.

History
The Nielsen TV Ratings have been produced in the USA since the 1950–1951 television season and statistically measure which programs are watched by different segments of the population. The most well-known portion is the "diary". During the four "sweeps" months of February, May, July and November, Nielsen interviewers in Oldsmar, Florida and Radcliff, Kentucky, ask homes to participate in filling out a diary of the programs watched in their home for a one-week period.

The Nielsen sample included roughly 1,700 audiometer homes and a rotating board of nearly 850 diary respondents by the early 1980s. Nielsen launched its Nielsen Homevideo Index (NHI) in 1980 to measure cable, pay cable, and VCRs, and the NHI began offering daily cable ratings in 1982. Nielsen's continued to advance with steady changes into the mid-2000s (decade). Along with changing their counting methods, Nielsen also started emphasizing their sample in 2003 in reaction to census shifts and requests from some industry sectors. Nielsen's automated Local People Meter (LPM) technology was introduced in New York and Los Angeles. The LPM improved the method of measurement from active and diary-based to passive and meter-monitored. More importantly, the LPM provides accurate measurements to particular local markets, verse a nationwide sample from the People meter. While diary-based surveys concentrated on quarterly sweeps periods, the industry has been pushed toward year-round measurement, due to the automated LPM system.

In 1996 Nielsen Media Research began tracking computer, internet, and video game usage through telephone surveys. Nielsen Media Research is a sister company to Nielsen NetRatings, which measures Internet and digital media audiences through a telephone and internet survey, and Nielsen BuzzMetrics, which measures Consumer-Generated Media. Nielsen also conducts market research for the film industry through National Research Group (NRG).

In September 2018, Nielsen acquired SuperData Research, an industry analysis firm that deals with tracking viewing habits within the video game and eSports areas, an area that Nielsen plans to expand into. Later, in April 2021, Nielsen stated they will close down SuperData and move its analysis and tracking into Nielsen Sports.

In September 2020, Nielsen started compiling a weekly Top 10 list of most watched shows on streaming platforms.

Nielsen TV ratings
Nielsen TV ratings (commonly referred to as Nielsen ratings) are the audience measurement systems operated by Nielsen Media Research that seek to determine the audience size and composition of television programming in the United States using a rating system.  Nielsen is no longer accredited by the Media Rating Council (MRC).
 
Nielsen Media Research was founded by Arthur C. Nielsen, a market analyst who started his career in the 1920s with marketing research and performance analysis. The company subsequently expanded into radio market analysis in the late 1930s, culminating in the Nielsen Radio Index in 1942, which was meant to provide statistics as to the markets of radio shows. The first Nielsen ratings for radio programs were released the first week of December 1947. They measured the top 20 programs in four areas: total audience, average audience, cumulative audience, and homes per dollar spent for time and talent.

In 1950, Nielsen then moved to television, developing a rating system using the methods he and his company had developed for radio. That method became the primary source of audience measurement information in the US television industry. In September 2020, Nielsen started compiling a weekly Top 10 list of most-watched shows on streaming platforms.

Measuring ratings
The data collection methods used to generate Nielsen TV ratings included:
 The Audimeter (audience meter) was used from 1950 during the early days of television broadcasting. It attached to a television and recorded the channels viewed, onto a 16mm film cartridge that was mailed weekly to company headquarters in Evanston, Illinois, and used to generate the Nielsen Television Index. It was based on an earlier Audimeter that had been developed for the 1942 Nielsen Radio Index. Randomly selected "Nielsen families" homes were enticed to accept the Audimeter by including free TV repair service provided by TV Index reps, which was a valuable commodity when vacuum tube televisions predominated.
 Paper "viewer diaries", in which a household recruited by the company self-recorded its viewing or listening habits. This adjunct Nielsen Station Index Service offered since 1953 targeted various demographics, particularly for local programming. The resulting statistical models provided a report of the audiences of any given show, network, and programming hour.  The company phased out this methodology as electronic data collection became more sophisticated. As of June 28, 2018 the Nielsen paper TV diary rating service was retired.
 In 1971 the Storage Instantaneous Audimeter allowed electronically recorded program viewing history to be forwarded to Nielsen via a telephone line, making overnight ratings possible.
 The upgraded People Meter, introduced in 1987, records individual viewing habits of the home and transmits the data nightly to Nielsen through a telephone line. This system is designed to allow market researchers to study television viewing on a minute-to-minute basis, recording when viewers change channels or turn off their television.
 Nielsen replaced People Meters with Portable People Meters (PPM), which collects the data of individual household members through the use of separate login credentials and allows the company to separate household viewing information into various demographic groups.

Changing systems of viewing have impacted Nielsen's methods of market research. In 2005, Nielsen began measuring the usage of digital video recording devices (DVRs) such as TiVos. Initial results indicated that time-shifted viewing (i.e., programs that are watched after the networks have aired them) would significantly impact television ratings. A year later, the networks were not factoring these new results into their ad rates because of advertisers' resistance.

In July 2017, Nielsen announced that it would include select programs from subscription-based video on demand (vSVOD) services Hulu and YouTube TV in its Digital in TV Ratings system.  Since about October 2017, Nielsen also began to track select programs from Netflix. Partnering distributors insert a "tag" into the program to be distributed on these services, which Nielsen then tracks through its meters system. Partnering distributors are able to determine if these ratings can be released publicly or not.

Ratings/share and total viewers
The most commonly cited Nielsen results are reported in two measurements: ratings points and share, usually reported as: "ratings points/share". There were 119.6 million TV homes in the U.S. for the 2017–18 TV season (Nielsen's National Television Household Universe, or Households Using Television, HUT). Nielsen re-estimates the number of television-equipped households each August for the upcoming television season.

The rating of a program is a fraction of the HUT. It is calculated as RTG = HUT × SHARE where HUT (or PUT when measuring demos) is Homes Using Television and SHARE is the percentage of TV sets in use which are tuned to a particular show.

Share is the percentage of television sets in use, Households Using Television (HUT) or Persons Using Television (PUT) who are tuned to a specific program, station or network in a specific area at a specific time. For example, Nielsen may report a show as receiving a 4.4/8 during its broadcast; this would mean that 4.4% of all television-equipped households (that is to say homes with a TV set, not total number of people) were tuned in to that program, while 8% of households that were watching TV at that time were watching the specific program.

Because ratings are based on samples, it is possible for shows to get a 0.0 rating, despite having an audience; the CNBC talk show McEnroe was one notable example. Another example is The CW show, CW Now, which received two 0.0 ratings in the same season. In 2014, Nielsen reported that American viewership of live television (totaling on average four hours and 32 minutes per day) had dropped 12 minutes per day compared to the year before. The CW got another 0.0 rating for its broadcast of the 1st Critics Choice Super Awards. Nielsen reported several reasons for the shift away from live television: increased viewership of time-shifted television (mainly through DVRs) and viewership of internet video (clips from video sharing websites and streams of full-length television shows).

Viewer location: out of home, on the go
In 2007 Nielsen began to release data that reflected out-of-home/not via home TV viewing.
 This was a follow-up to their added inclusiveness regarding family members who are dorming in college.

Demographics
Since specific demographics influence advertising rates, Nielsen provides statistics by categories including age, gender, race, economic class, and area. For example, an advertiser might look for younger viewers, for older or wealthier audiences, or for women rather than men.

In general, the number of viewers within the 18–49 age range is more important than the total number of viewers. According to Advertising Age, during the 2007–08 season, ABC was able to charge $419,000 per commercial sold during its medical drama Grey's Anatomy, compared to only $248,000 for a commercial during CBS' CSI: Crime Scene Investigation, despite CSI having almost five million more viewers on average. Because of its strength in young "demos" (demographic groups), NBC was able to charge almost three times as much for a commercial during Friends as CBS charged for Murder, She Wrote, even though the two series had a similar amount of total viewership during the two seasons they were on the air concurrently. Glee (on Fox) and The Office (on NBC) drew fewer total viewers than NCIS (on CBS) during the 2009–10 season, but earned an average of $272,694 and $213,617 respectively, compared to $150,708 for NCIS.

Commercial ratings
Nielsen also provides viewership data calculated as the average viewership for only the commercial time within the program. These "Commercial Ratings" first became available on May 31, 2007. Additionally, Nielsen provides different "streams" of this data in order to take into consideration delayed viewing (DVR) data, at any interval up to seven days. C3 was the metric launched in 2007, and refers to the ratings for average commercial minutes in live programming plus total playback by digital video recorder up to three days after. In 2009, dissatisfaction with Nielsen's effectiveness resulted in formation of the Council for Innovative Media Measurement
by more than six major broadcast media companies.

By the end of 2012, some television executives wanted to see C7, ratings for live plus seven days, with CBS Corporation chief executive officer Les Moonves making the claim C7 made ratings increase by 30%.

Sweeps

The American television measurement by Nielsen is based on three different methodological approaches. In the 25 TV markets with the highest sales (e.g. New York, Los Angeles, Chicago, Denver), the Local People Meter (LPM) is measured. Individuals register individually; the measurement is carried out on 365 days over 24 hours. The SET Meter (Diary & Electronic) is used in 31 smaller markets (such as Nashville, Salt Lake City). In four sweeps in February, May, July, and November, target group data are collected with the diary and validated with the data of the devices (TV set on/off) in the participating households. In the 154 TV markets with the lowest sales (e. g. Harrisburg, PA or Honolulu) the use of TV is only recorded using a diary survey.

Each year until 2018, Nielsen processed approximately two million paper diaries from households across the United States, for November, February, May, and July—also known as the "sweeps" rating periods. The term "sweeps" dates from 1954, when Nielsen collected diaries from households in the Eastern United States first; from there they would "sweep" west. Seven-day diaries (or eight-day diaries in homes with DVRs) were mailed to homes to keep a tally of what was watched on each television set and by whom. Over the course of a sweeps period, diaries were mailed to a new panel of homes each week. At the end of the month, all of the viewing data from the individual weeks was aggregated. One exception to the normal sweeps periods occurred in 2008–09 when the February sweeps period was moved to March to accommodate the digital television transition, which was scheduled to take place on February 17, 2009. The transition date was later moved to June 12, but Nielsen kept the sweeps period in March that year rather than moving it again.

This local viewing information provides a basis for program scheduling and advertising decisions for local television stations, cable systems, and advertisers. Typically, the November, February, and May sweeps are considered more important; nevertheless, the July sweeps can have a local impact regarding personnel.

In some mid-size markets, diaries provide viewer information for up to two additional "sweeps" months (October and January).

Criticism of ratings systems
There is some public critique regarding accuracy and potential bias within Nielsen's rating system, including some concerns that the Nielsen ratings system is rapidly becoming outdated because of new technology like smartphones, DVRs, tablet computers and Internet streaming services as preferred or alternative methods for television viewing. In June 2006, however, Nielsen announced a plan to revamp its entire methodology to include all types of media viewing in its sample. Since viewers are aware of being part of the Nielsen sample, it can lead to response bias in recording and viewing habits. Audience counts gathered by the self-reporting diary methodology are sometimes higher than those gathered by the electronic meters, eliminating any response bias.

Another criticism of the measuring system itself is that it fails the most important sample criterion: it is not random. A small fraction of the population is selected, and only those accepted are used as the sample size. In many local areas during the 1990s, the difference between a rating that kept a show on the air and one that would cancel it was so small as to be statistically insignificant. Yet, the show with the higher rating would survive. In addition, the Nielsen ratings encouraged a strong push for demographic measurements. This caused problems with households with multiple television sets or households where viewers would enter the simpler codes (usually their child's), raising serious questions about the demographic data quality. The situation further deteriorated as the popularity of cable television increased the number of viewable networks to the extent that the margin of error has increased because the sampling sizes are too small. Compounding matters is that of the sample data that is collected, advertisers will not pay for time shifted programs (those that are recorded for replay at a different time), rendering the "raw" numbers useless from a statistical point of view. Even in 2013, it was noted that Internet streams of television programs were still not counted because they had either no ads (such as Netflix) or totally different advertising (such as Hulu) than their television counterparts, effectively skewing the raw data on a show's popularity.

A related criticism of the Nielsen rating system is its lack of a system for measuring television audiences outside homes, such as college dormitories, transport terminals, bars, prisons and other public places where television is frequently viewed, often by large numbers of people in a common setting. In 2005, Nielsen announced plans to incorporate viewing by away-from-home college students into its sample. Internet television viewing is another rapidly growing market for which Nielsen ratings fail to account for viewers. iTunes, Hulu, YouTube, and some of the networks' own websites (such as ABC.com and CBS.com) provide full-length web-based programming, either subscription-based or ad-supported. Though websites can already track a site's popularity and the referring page, they cannot track viewer demographics. To both track this and expand their market research offerings, Nielsen purchased NetRatings in 2007. However, as noted in a February 2012 New York Times article, the computer and mobile streams of a program are counted separately from the standard television broadcasts, further degrading the overall quality of the sampling data. As a result, there was no way for NBC to tell if there was any overlap between the roughly 111.3 million traditional television viewers  and 2.1 million live stream viewers of Super Bowl XLVII.

Responding to the criticism regarding accusations by several media executives (including Viacom CEO Phillippe Dauman and former Fox Entertainment Group chief operating officer Chase Carey) that it failed to count viewers watching television programs on digital platforms, Nielsen executive vice president of global product leadership Megan Clarken stated in an April 2015 summit by the Coalition for Innovative Media Measurement that the company can count digital viewers in audience and demographic reports but is unable to do so under the current set of rules devised by networks and advertising industries last revised in 2006. As such, Nielsen can only count viewership for television-originated broadcasts, and must exclude viewers who watch programs on digital platforms if the program does not have an identical advertising load or a linear watermark.

After Nielsen took over the contract for producing data on Irish advertising in 2009, agencies said that they were "disastrous" and claimed that the information produced by them is too inaccurate to be trusted by them or their clients.

In 2004, News Corporation retained the services of public relations firm Glover Park to launch a campaign aimed at delaying Nielsen's plan to replace its aging household electronic data collection methodology in larger local markets with its newer electronic People Meter system. The advocates in the public relations campaign claimed that data derived from the newer People Meter system represented a bias toward underreporting minority viewing, leading to a de facto discrimination in employment against minority actors and writers. However, Nielsen countered the campaign by revealing its sample composition counts. According to Nielsen Media Research's sample composition counts, nationwide, African American households using People Meters represented 6.7% of the Nielsen sample, compared to 6.0% in the general population. Latino households represent 5.7% of the Nielsen sample, compared to 5.0% in the general population. By October 2006, News Corporation and Nielsen settled, with Nielsen agreeing to spend an additional $50 million to ensure that minority viewing was not being underreported by the new electronic people meter system.

In 2011, CBS and Nielsen proposed a model consisting of six viewer segments, which according to their empirical research, are more relevant for advertisers than older models based on gender and age. The segments are based on user behavior, motivations, and psychographics. It is argued that the model can increase reaching the desired audience and message recall and advertisement likeability.

Advent of streaming 
In September 2020, Nielsen began releasing a weekly list of top 10 television shows most watched on streaming platforms or subscription video on demand (SVOD).

Top-rated programs in the U.S.

The table below lists television shows in the U.S. with the highest average household Nielsen rating for each television season.

{| class="wikitable" style="text-align:center"
|-
! rowspan="2" style="width:9%;" | Season 
! colspan="4" style="width:34%;" | Live
! colspan="3" style="width:28%;" | Live + 3 DVR 
! colspan="3" style="width:28%;" | Live + 7 DVR 
|-
! style="width:15%;" | Show 
! style="width:5%;" | Network
! style="width:7%;" | Households(in millions)
! style="width:7%;" | Viewers(in millions)
! style="width:15%;" | Show 
! style="width:5%;" | Network
! style="width:7%;" | Viewers(in millions)
! style="width:15%;" | Show 
! style="width:5%;" | Network
! style="width:7%;" | Viewers(in millions)
|-
| colspan="11" 
|-
| 1950–1951
| Texaco Star Theatre
| NBC
| 6.28
| 
| 
| 
| 
| 
| 
| 
|-
| 1951–1952
| Arthur Godfrey's Talent Scouts
| rowspan="9" | CBS
| 8.23
| 
| 
| 
| 
| 
| 
| 
|-
| 1952–1953
| rowspan="3" | I Love Lucy
| 13.73
| 
| 
| 
| 
| 
| 
| 
|-
| 1953–1954
| 15.29
| 
| 
| 
| 
| 
| 
| 
|-
| 1954–1955
| 15.14
| 
| 
| 
| 
| 
| 
| 
|-
| 1955–1956
| The $64,000 Question
| 16.58
| 
| 
| 
| 
| 
| 
| 
|-
| 1956–1957
| I Love Lucy
| 17.00
| 
| 
| 
| 
| 
| 
| 
|-
| 1957–1958
| rowspan="3" | Gunsmoke
| 18.07
| 
| 
| 
| 
| 
| 
| 
|-
| 1958–1959
| 17.40
| 
| 
| 
| 
| 
| 
| 
|-
| 1959–1960
| 18.44
| 
| 
| 
| 
| 
| 
| 
|-
| colspan="11" 
|-
| 1960–1961
| Gunsmoke
| CBS
| 17.61
| 
| 
| 
| 
| 
| 
| 
|-
| 1961–1962
| Wagon Train
| NBC
| 15.59
| 
| 
| 
| 
| 
| 
| 
|-
| 1962–1963
| rowspan="2" | The Beverly Hillbillies
| rowspan="2" | CBS
| 18.11
| 
| 
| 
| 
| 
| 
| 
|-
| 1963–1964
| 20.18
| 
| 
| 
| 
| 
| 
| 
|-
| 1964–1965
| rowspan="3" | Bonanza
| rowspan="3" | NBC
| 19.13
| 
| 
| 
| 
| 
| 
| 
|-
| 1965–1966
| 17.12
| 
| 
| 
| 
| 
| 
| 
|-
| 1966–1967
| 16.04
| 
| 
| 
| 
| 
| 
| 
|-
| 1967–1968
| The Andy Griffith Show
| CBS
| 15.64
| 
| 
| 
| 
| 
| 
| 
|-
| 1968–1969
| rowspan="2" | Rowan & Martin's Laugh-In
| rowspan="2" | NBC
| 18.52
| 
| 
| 
| 
| 
| 
| 
|-
| 1969–1970
| 15.39
| 
| 
| 
| 
| 
| 
| 
|-
| colspan="11" 
|-
| 1970–1971
| Marcus Welby, M.D.
| ABC
| 17.79
| 
| 
| 
| 
| 
| 
| 
|-
| 1971–1972
| rowspan="5" | All in the Family
| rowspan="5" | CBS
| 21.11
| 
| 
| 
| 
| 
| 
| 
|-
| 1972–1973
| 21.58
| 
| 
| 
| 
| 
| 
| 
|-
| 1973–1974
| 20.65
| 
| 
| 
| 
| 
| 
| 
|-
| 1974–1975
| 20.69
| 
| 
| 
| 
| 
| 
| 
|-
| 1975–1976
| 20.95
| 
| 
| 
| 
| 
| 
| 
|-
| 1976–1977
| Happy Days
| rowspan="3" | ABC
| 22.43
| 
| 
| 
| 
| 
| 
| 
|-
| 1977–1978
| rowspan="2" | Laverne & Shirley
| 23.04
| 
| 
| 
| 
| 
| 
| 
|-
| 1978–1979
| 22.72
| 
| 
| 
| 
| 
| 
| 
|-
| 1979–1980
| 60 Minutes
| CBS
| 21.67
| 
| 
| 
| 
| 
| 
| 
|-
| colspan="11" 
|-
| 1980–1981
| rowspan="2" | Dallas
| rowspan="4" | CBS
| 27.57
| 
| 
| 
| 
| 
| 
| 
|-
| 1981–1982
| 23.15
| 
| 
| 
| 
| 
| 
| 
|-
| 1982–1983
| 60 Minutes
| 21.24
| 
| 
| 
| 
| 
| 
| 
|-
| 1983–1984
| Dallas
| 21.54
| 
| 
| 
| 
| 
| 
| 
|-
| 1984–1985
| Dynasty
| ABC
| 21.23
| 
| 
| 
| 
| 
| 
| 
|-
| 1985–1986
| rowspan="5" | The Cosby Show
| rowspan="5" | NBC
| 28.95
| 
| 
| 
| 
| 
| 
| 
|-
| 1986–1987
| 30.50
| 
| 
| 
| 
| 
| 
| 
|-
| 1987–1988
| 
| 
| 
| 
| 
| 
| 
| 
|-
| 1988–1989
| 23.14
| 
| 
| 
| 
| 
| 
| 
|-
| rowspan="2" | 1989–1990
| rowspan="2" | 21.28
| 
| 
| 
| 
| 
| 
| 
|-
| Roseanne
| ABC
| 
| 
| 
| 
| 
| 
| 
|-
| colspan="11" 
|-
| 1990–1991
| Cheers
| NBC
| 19.83
| 
| 
| 
| 
| 
| 
| 
|-
| 1991–1992
| rowspan="3" | 60 Minutes
| rowspan="3" | CBS
| 20.17
| 
| 
| 
| 
| 
| 
| 
|-
| 1992–1993
| 20.39
| 
| 
| 
| 
| 
| 
| 
|-
| 1993–1994
| 19.69
| 
| 
| 
| 
| 
| 
| 
|-
| 1994–1995
| Seinfeld
| rowspan="5" | NBC
| 19.65
| 
| 
| 
| 
| 
| 
| 
|-
| 1995–1996
| rowspan="2" | ER
| 21.10
| 
| 
| 
| 
| 
| 
| 
|-
| 1996–1997
| 20.56
| 30.79
| 
| 
| 
| 
| 
| 
|-
| 1997–1998
| Seinfeld
| 21.27
| 34.10
| 
| 
| 
| 
| 
| 
|-
| 1998–1999
| ER
| 17.69
| 25.40
| 
| 
| 
| 
| 
| 
|-
| 1999–2000
| Who Wants to Be a Millionaire (Tues)
| ABC
| 
| 28.53
| 
| 
| 
| 
| 
| 
|-
| colspan="11" 
|-
| 2000–2001
| Survivor
| CBS
| 
| 29.80
| 
| 
| 
| 
| 
| 
|-
| 2001–2002
| Friends
| NBC
| 
| 24.50
| 
| 
| 
| 
| 
| 
|-
| 2002–2003
| CSI: Crime Scene Investigation
| CBS
| 
| 26.12
| 
| 
| 
| 
| 
| 
|-
| 2003–2004
| rowspan="3" | American Idol (Tues)
| rowspan="7" | Fox
| 
| 25.73
| 
| 
| 
| 
| 
| 
|-
| 2004–2005
| 
| 27.32
| 
| 
| 
| 
| 
| 
|-
| 2005–2006
| 
| 31.17
| 
| 
| 
| 
| 
| 
|-
| 2006–2007
| American Idol (Wed)
| 
| 30.58
| 
| 
| 
| 
| 
| 
|-
| 2007–2008
| American Idol (Tues)
| 
| 28.80
| 
| 
| 
| 
| 
| 
|-
| 2008–2009
| American Idol (Wed)
| 
| 25.53
| 
| 
| 
| American Idol (Wed)
| rowspan="2" | Fox
| 26.88
|-
| 2009–2010
| American Idol (Tues)
| 
| 22.97
| 
| 
| 
| American Idol (Tues)
| 24.71
|-
| colspan="11" 
|-
| 2010–2011
| American Idol (Wed)
| Fox
| 
| 23.95
| 
| 
| 
| American Idol (Wed)
| Fox
| 26.20
|-
| 2011–2012
| rowspan="9" | NBC Sunday Night Football
| rowspan="9" | NBC
| 
| 
| 
| 
| 
| NBC Sunday Night Football
| NBC
| 20.74
|-
| 2012–2013
| 
| 
| 
| 
| 
| NCIS{{efn|Note that NBC Sunday Night Football airs three broadcasts -- NFL weeks 1-2 and the Kickoff Game -- before the official start of television season which are not counted in the rankings. If these broadcasts were counted, NBC Sunday Night Football would average 21.44 million viewers—more than NCIS.  The NFL Thanksgiving Game is counted as part of Sunday Night Football for ratings, but not the Kickoff Game or Weeks 1-2.}}
| rowspan="2"| CBS
| 21.34
|-
| 2013–2014
| 
| 21.42
| 
| 
| 
| The Big Bang Theory| 23.10
|-
| 2014–2015
| 
| 20.69
| 
| 
| 
| rowspan="3" | NBC Sunday Night Football| rowspan="3" | NBC
| 20.81
|-
| 2015–2016
| 
| 21.30
| rowspan="2" | NBC Sunday Night Football| rowspan="2" | NBC
| 21.38
| 21.39
|-
| 2016–2017
| 
| 19.63
| 19.73
| 19.75
|-
| 2017–2018
| 
| 17.58
| Roseanne| ABC
| 18.21
| Roseanne| ABC
| 19.96
|-
| 2018–2019
| 
| 18.80
| NBC Sunday Night Football| NBC
| 18.92
| rowspan="2"|NBC Sunday Night Football| rowspan="2"|NBC
| 18.94
|-
| 2019–2020
| 
| 19.96
| 
| 
| 
| 20.09
|-
| colspan="11" 
|-
| 2020–2021
| 
| 
| 
| 
| 
| 
| 
| NBC Sunday Night Football| NBC
| 16.50
|-
| 2021–2022
| 
| 
| 
| 
| 
| 
| 
| NBC Sunday Night Football| NBC
| 18.00
|-
|}

Notes

 Television network ratings by year  
(Average primetime viewership)

Nielsen SVOD content ratings
Starting in September 2020, Nielsen releases a weekly list of top 10 television shows most watched on streaming platforms, or subscription video on demand (SVOD). This immediately attracted attention by mainstream media, such as Variety, Hollywood Reporter, Deadline and Business Insider.

See also

Automated Measurement of Lineups (AMOL)
Media Market or Designated Market Area (DMA)

 C. E. Hooper
 Crossley ratings
 Nielsen Audio
 Top-rated United States television programs by season
 List of most watched television broadcasts in the United States
 List of most watched television broadcasts
 Wikipedia:List of U.S. television ratings archives

References

Further reading
 

External links
 
 VNU Group bv

General sources
 Lotz, Amanda D. "The Television Will Be Revolutionized". New York University Press''.
 Stoddard Jr., Laurence R. "The History of People Meters: How We Got There (And Why)". United Kingdom, Cambridge University Press.

American companies established in 1996
Audience measurement
Companies based in New York City
Kohlberg Kravis Roberts companies
Lists of American television series
Market research companies of the United States
Market research organizations
Mass media rivalries
Promotion and marketing communications
Television terminology